Mystery Quest is a platform game developed by Carry Lab. It was published in Japan by Square on May 1, 1987, and in North America by Taxan in April 1989. The game follows the journey of Hao on his quest to become a wizard.

References

External links
 

1987 video games
Famicom Disk System games
Nintendo Entertainment System games
Platform games
Square (video game company) games
Video games developed in Japan